Institut Notre-Dame, called IND is a private school network in the Yvelines department of France, in the Paris metropolitan area. It has three schools which are based in St-Germain-en-Laye and Sartrouville.

History

It originated as the Institut national de St-Germain-en-Laye, which first opened in 1795. The current iteration, as the Institut Note-Dame, first opened in 1948.

This network is representing by three schools :
- Primaire Notre-Dame in St-Germain-en-Laye (Maternelle/Primaire)- Secondaire Notre-Dame in St-Germain-en-Laye (Collège/Lycée)- Lycée Jean-Paul II in Sartrouville

References

External links
 Institut Notre-Dame 

Private schools in France
Schools in Yvelines
Secondary schools in France
Lycées in Yvelines